Illahee is an unincorporated community in Kitsap County, Washington, United States, between Bremerton and Silverdale. It is home to Illahee State Park and other local parks. The word "Illahee" means earth or country in the Native language Chinuk Wawa.

Geography
Illahee's elevation is 36 feet (11 m).

Port of Illahee
The Port of Illahee community dock was built around 1916 to serve the Puget Sound Mosquito Fleet. In later years this port was used by the United States Navy to demagnetize ships.

Ecological Status 
The official shellfish harvesting status of the Port of Illahee is maintained by the National Shellfish Sanitation Program. In addition, environmental contaminants of the surface-water and Mytilus tissues at the Port of Illahee are monitored routinely by local ecology programs.  While historical monitoring has reported low concentrations of heavy metals over the past decade (2010-2020), the presence of carcinogenic polycyclic aromatic hydrocarbons (cPAHs) in Mytilus tissues should be considered by recreational and subsistence consumers. PAH concentrations in Puget Sound have been highlighted by the National Oceanic and Atmospheric Administration as being the highest in the nation and cPAH regulatory thresholds for Washington State consumers have been calculated by the Washington State Department of Ecology. The following table provides Washington State cPAH thresholds (current as of 2020) for general fish consumption and available historical tissue burdens at the Port of Illahee.

Parks and recreation

 Illahee State Park, located north of eastern Bremerton, is part of the Washington State Park System. The waterfront land for the park was acquired between 1934 and 1954. The park offers camping, hiking, a boat launch, and a dock.

The  Illahee Preserve and the  Rolling Hills golf course are both in Illahee as well.

References
 

Unincorporated communities in Kitsap County, Washington
Unincorporated communities in Washington (state)